Mese Township is a township of Mese District in the Kayah State of Myanmar. The capital town is Mese.

References

Townships of Kayah State